Mistral Aviation was an airline from the Republic of the Congo, which flew five times per week between Brazzaville and Point Noire. Twice between Brazzaville and Impfondo.

Fleet
 2 – Douglas DC-9

References

Defunct airlines of the Republic of the Congo
Airlines disestablished in 2009